Nicanor Fortich Jorge Jr. (November 27, 1941 – June 13, 2020) was a Filipino basketball coach who has led the Philippines and Singapore men's national teams. He is also the founder of the Best Center, a sports training institution which has produced several national team and professional players.

Early life and education
Nicanor Fortich Jorge, Jr. was born on November 27, 1941 in Manila. He studied at the University of the Philippines Diliman where he took a BSE degree in physical education. He also played for the UP Fighting Maroons, with his performance helping him secure a tenure as coach of the collegiate team.

Coaching career
Jorge started his coaching career in the 1960s when he became head coach of the UP Fighting Maroons basketball team at age 21. In 1994, Jorge led the Maroons to a third place finish.

Jorge has also served as a head coach for several Philippine Basketball Association teams. In the 1980 season, he coached the Galleon Shippers (which renamed itself as the CDCP Road Builders) until its disbandment before the 1982 season. For the 1983 season, Jorge coached the Manhattan Shirtmakers in the All-Filipino Conference.

He returned to coaching the UP Fighting Maroons succeeding, Eric Altamirano and coached the team from 1997 to 1999. In 1997 he led the collegiate team to a Final Four finish.

International career
Jorge coached the national team which played at the 1978 FIBA World Championship and the 1978 Asian Games. Jorge also led the Singapore national team at the 1983 Southeast Asian Games.

Sports administration
Jorge was Secretary General of the Basketball Association of the Philippines (BAP) in the 1980s, which was the governing body for basketball in the Philippines until its replacement by the Samahang Basketbol ng Pilipinas (SBP). He also played a role in the SBP's grassroots program.

Best Center
Nic Jorge is credited with founding the Best Center, a sports training center in 1978. The center has produced several national team and professional basketball players including, Jerry Codiñera, Jun Limpot, Benjie Paras, Kiefer Ravena, and Chris Tiu.

Death
Jorge died in his sleep on June 13, 2020 in Iloilo City.

Personal life
Jorge was married to Marilyn with whom he had three children.

References

1942 births
2020 deaths
Filipino men's basketball coaches
Filipino sports executives and administrators
People from Iloilo City
Philippine Basketball Association coaches
Philippines men's national basketball team coaches
University of the Philippines Diliman alumni
UP Fighting Maroons basketball players
UP Fighting Maroons basketball coaches